Bell River, a watercourse that is part of the Macquarie catchment within the Murray–Darling basin, is located in the central west region of New South Wales, Australia.

Course
The river rises in the hills north-west of Orange and flows generally north past the town of Molong, joining the Macquarie River at Wellington. The course of the river is generally aligned with the Mitchell Highway, with the river dropping  over its  course.

Platypus have often been sighted in the lower reaches of the Bell River.

History

Aboriginal history
The original inhabitants of the land surrounding the Bell River were Australian Aborigines of the Wiradjuri clan.

European history
The area surrounding the Bell River was first explored by John Oxley who named the river in honour of Brevet Major Bell.

Alluvial gold was discovered in and along the river in 1851, inspiring a minor gold rush, most notably near the confluence of the Nubrigyn Creek with the Bell River.

Minor flooding of the Bell River occurs sporadically, before its junction with the Macquarie River, including in 1920, 1926, and 1990 at Newrea, where the river reached .

References

External links
 

Rivers of New South Wales
Tributaries of the Macquarie River